Communidad de Teruel is a comarca in Aragon, Spain. Its capital is Teruel, the capital of Teruel Province.

Teruel city gives its name to this comarca located in the mountainous Iberian System area.

Municipalities
Ababuj, Aguatón, Aguilar del Alfambra, Alba, Alfambra, Almohaja, Alobras, Alpeñés, Argente, Camañas, Camarillas, Cañada Vellida, Cascante del Río, Cedrillas, Celadas, Cella, Corbalán, Cubla, El Cuervo, Cuevas Labradas, Escorihuela, Fuentes Calientes, Galve, Jorcas, Libros, Lidón, Monteagudo del Castillo, Orrios, Pancrudo, Peralejos, Perales del Alfambra, El Pobo, Rillo, Riodeva, Santa Eulalia del Campo, Teruel, Tormón, Torrelacárcel, Torremocha de Jiloca, Tramacastiel, Valacloche, Veguillas de la Sierra, Villarquemado, Villastar, Villel, Visiedo

See also
Teruel Province

References

External links 
Teruel Community Comarca official page
Comunidad de Teruel, Aragon Govt.

Comarcas of Aragon
Geography of the Province of Teruel